Klášter is a municipality and village in Plzeň-South District in the Plzeň Region of the Czech Republic. It has about 200 inhabitants.

Etymology
The name Klášter means literally "monastery".

Geography
It lies on the border between the Švihov Highlands and Blatná Uplands. The Úslava River flows through the municipality. The village is situated on the shores of Klášterský Pond.

History

History of the village is connected with the medieval Cistercian monastery, which was founded here in 1144–1145 by monks from the Ebrach Abbey. It was destroyed by the Hussites during the Hussite Wars in 1420. After the monastery was destroyed, a village began to emerge in its ruins, whose new inhabitants used the remains of buildings to build their dwellings. The first written mention of the village of Klášter is from 1556.

The Zelená Hora Castle was first mentioned in a deed of Ottokar II of Bohemia from 1221. Until 1420, it was property of the monastery. In 1425, after the monastery ceased to exist, all its properties were acquired by the town of Klatovy and the castle became the new centre fo the estate. In 1436, it became property of the Lords of Schwamberg. The most notable owners of the estate were the Sternberg family, who acquired it around 1464 and held it until 1726. Most likely between 1670 and 1688, the medieval castle was rebuilt into an early Baroque residence.

Zelená Hora was then owned by the houses of Martinic (1726–1784), Colloredo-Mansfeld (1784–1852), and Auersperg (1852–1931). In 1817–1819, the castle became known as the site where Manuscript of Zelená Hora was founded. After the castle was shortly owned by Czech private owners, it was confiscated by the state in 1938.

Demographics

Sights

Most of the village is placed inside the ruins of the monastery. The monastery was among the most important monasteries in Kingdom of Bohemia in the 13th and 14th centuries and was formed by a monumental Romanesque-Gothic complex of buildings. Their remains are still visible.

The landmark of Klášter is the Zelená Hora Castle, located on the eponymous hill. Since 2020, it has been opened to the public.

The Chapel of Saint Margaret was built in the late Empire style in 1861–1862.

In popular culture
Zelená Hora Castle became nationwide popular as the filming location of the 1992 film Černí baroni.

References

External links

Villages in Plzeň-South District
Ruined abbeys and monasteries